Manuel Mantilla (born September 25, 1973) is an amateur  boxer from Cuba, who represented his native country in the Men's Flyweight (– 51 kg) category at the 2000 Summer Olympics in Sydney, Australia.

There he was stopped in the quarterfinals by Thailand's eventual gold medalist Wijan Ponlid. Mantilla won several medals in the same weight division on the continental level in the 1990s.

References
 

1973 births
Living people
Flyweight boxers
Boxers at the 1999 Pan American Games
Boxers at the 2000 Summer Olympics
Olympic boxers of Cuba
Cuban male boxers
AIBA World Boxing Championships medalists
Pan American Games bronze medalists for Cuba
Pan American Games medalists in boxing
Central American and Caribbean Games gold medalists for Cuba
Competitors at the 1993 Central American and Caribbean Games
Competitors at the 1998 Central American and Caribbean Games
Central American and Caribbean Games medalists in boxing
Medalists at the 1999 Pan American Games
20th-century Cuban people